The Battle of Dathin was a battle during the Arab–Byzantine Wars between the Rashidun Caliphate and the Byzantine Empire in February 634, but became very famous in the literature of the period.

The battle took place following a series of Arab raids around Gaza. The Byzantine commander (dux and candidatus)  Sergius assembled a small detachment of soldiers (due to a shortage of troops), and led that mounted army from his base at Caesarea some 125 kilometers south to the vicinity of Gaza. From there he proceeded against an Arab force that was numerically superior and commanded by 'Amr ibn al-'As. The opposing forces met at the village of Dathin on February 4, not far from Gaza. The Byzantines were defeated and the candidatus Sergius himself was killed, together with 300 of his soldiers. The battle also claimed the lives of 4,000 civilians.

According to the near-contemporary Doctrina Jacobi nuper baptizati, the Muslim victory was celebrated by the local Jews, who had been a persecuted minority within the Roman Empire.

Notes

References 
 Al-Baladhuri, Ahmad ibn Jabir. The Origins of the Islamic State, Part I. Trans. Philip Khuri Hitti. New York: Columbia University, 1916.
 "Extract From a Chronicle Composed About AD 640." The Seventh Century in the West-Syrian Chronicles. Trans. Andrew Palmer. Liverpool: Liverpool University Press, 1993. 
 
 
 Al-Tabari, Abu Ja'far Muhammad ibn Jarir. The History of al-Tabari, Volume XI: The Challenge to the Empires. Trans. Khalid Yahya Blankinship. Ed. Ehsan Yar-Shater. Albany, NY: State University of New York Press, 1993. 
 Theophanes the Confessor. The Chronicle of Theophanes. Ed. and trans. Harry Turtledove. Philadelphia: University of Pennsylvania Press, 1982. 
 

630s in the Byzantine Empire
Dathin
Dathin
Dathin
634
Muslim conquest of the Levant